Polydamas or Poludamas (Greek: Πολυδάμας), feminine Polydama or Polydamna, may refer to:

Polydamas (mythology), Trojan hero
Polydamas of Skotoussa, Thessalian wrestler 5th century BC
Polydamas of Pharsalus, Thessalian statesman 4th century BC
Polydamas of Macedon, general 4th century BC
Battus polydamas, butterfly species
 Polydamna, wife of Thon